John W. "Jack" Callender (2 April 1923 – 22 May 2001) was an English professional football wing half of the 1940s and 1950s.

Career
Born in Wylam, Callender began his career before World War II, in 1938 with Gateshead, who would be his sole Football League club. He went on to establish the club record for most appearances for the club in the Football League during his long stay; Callender is the record appearance holder for Gateshead with 511 (league and FA Cup). He made 471 Football League appearances, scoring 42 goals and 40 appearances in the FA Cup, scoring 7 goals.

At Gateshead, Callender and his brother Tom made 910 league appearances, a record for two brothers at the same club. After his departure from Gateshead Callender played for Consett for a while.

Callender died on 22 May 2001, aged 78.

References

1923 births
2001 deaths
People from Wylam
Footballers from Northumberland
English footballers
Gateshead A.F.C. players
Consett A.F.C. players
Association football wing halves